Marina Bay Sands is an integrated resort fronting Marina Bay in Singapore and a landmark of the city. At its opening in 2010, it was deemed the world's most expensive standalone casino property at S$8 billion (US$6.88 billion). The resort includes a 2,561-room hotel, a  convention-exhibition centre, the  The Shoppes at Marina Bay Sands mall, a museum, a large theatre, "celebrity chef" restaurants, two floating crystal pavilions, art-science exhibits, and the world's largest atrium casino with 500 tables and 1,600 slot machines. The 20-hectare resort was designed by Moshe Safdie architects.

The resort is owned by Las Vegas Sands in agreement with the Singaporean authorities. Marina Bay Sands was originally set to open in 2009, but its construction faced delays caused by escalating costs of material and labour shortages from the outset exacerbated by the global financial crisis. This pressured Las Vegas Sands to delay its projects elsewhere to complete the integrated resort. Its owner decided to open the integrated resort in stages, and it was approved by the Singapore authorities. The resort and SkyPark were officially opened on 23 and 24 June 2010 as part of a two-day celebration, following the casino's opening on 27 April that year. The SkyPark opened the following day. The theatre was completed in time for the first performance of Riverdance on 30 November. The indoor skating rink, which uses artificial ice, opened to a performance by Michelle Kwan on 18 December. The ArtScience Museum opened to the public and the debut of a 13-minute light, laser and water show called Wonder Full on 19 February 2011 marked the full completion of the integrated resort.

The opening of Marina Bay Sands was held on 17 February 2011. It also marked the opening of the seven celebrity chef restaurants. The last portion of the Marina Bay Sands, the floating pavilions, were finally opened to the public when the two tenants, Louis Vuitton and Pangaea Club, opened on 18 and 22 September 2011, respectively.

Marina Bay Sands is set to have a fourth tower constructed by 2026. The expansion plan was announced in early April of 2022, with the new tower containing 1000 hotel rooms and an adjoining concert venue with seating for 15,000 guests.

Background

Marina Bay Sands is one of two winning proposals for Singapore's first integrated resorts, the other being the Resorts World Sentosa, which incorporates a family-friendly Universal Studios Theme Park (Universal Studios Singapore). The two large-scale resorts were conceived to meet Singapore's economic and tourism objectives for the next decade and will have 30-year casino licenses, exclusive for the first ten years.
Bidders were assessed based on four criteria: tourism appeal and contribution, architectural concept and design, development investment, and strength of the consortium and partners.

On 27 May 2006, Las Vegas Sands (LVS) was declared the winner with its business-oriented resort. LVS submitted its winning bid on its own. Its original partner City Developments Limited (CDL), with a proposed 15% equity stake, pulled out of the partnership in the second phase of the tender process. CDL's CEO, Kwek Leng Beng said his company's pullout was a combination of factors—such as difficulties in getting numerous companies he owns to comply in time, as well as reluctance of some parties to disclose certain private information in probity checks required by the Singapore government. However, Kwek was retained as an advisor for Sands' bid.

Investment
Las Vegas Sands initially committed to invest S$3.85 billion in the project, not including the fixed S$1.2 billion cost of the  site itself. With the escalating costs of materials, such as sand and steel, and labour shortages owing to other major infrastructure and property development in the country, Sheldon Adelson placed the total cost of the development at S$8.0 billion as of July 2009.

Las Vegas Sands declared the undertaking as "one of the world's most challenging construction projects and certainly the most expensive stand-alone integrated resort property ever built". It expected the casino to generate at least $1 billion in annual profit. Two months after the initial phased opening, the casino was attracting around 25,000 visitors daily, about a third being Singaporeans and permanent residents who paid a $150 daily entry levy or $3,000 for annual unlimited access. Half a million gamblers passed through the casino in June 2010. In the third quarter of 2012, the revenues of the Marina Bay Sands fell almost 28 per cent from a year earlier.

For the economy, Marina Bay Sands was projected to stimulate an addition of $2.7 billion or 0.8% to Singapore's Gross Domestic Product by 2015, employing 10,000 people directly and 20,000 jobs being created in other industries. 

On 3 April 2019, Sands announced a $3.3 billion expansion of its Marina Bay Sands property in Singapore. The expansion will include the construction of a fourth hotel tower containing 1,000 luxury suites and a 15,000-seat arena.

As the development of Marina Bay Sands was perceived as critical in Singapore's urbanization efforts, a fixed price was set for the land. This was a departure from the government auctioning off the land to the highest bidder. Bidders were instead assessed holistically on factors such as the design of the Marina Bay Sands and the amenities it would offer.

Design and construction

The resort is designed by Moshe Safdie, who says it was initially inspired by card decks. The prominent feature of the design is the three hotel towers, which has 2,500 rooms and suites, and a continuous lobby at the base links the three towers. The casino has a four-storey central atrium with four levels of gaming and entertainment in one space. The resort's architecture and major design changes along the way were also approved by its feng shui consultants, the late Chong Swan Lek and Louisa Ong-Lee. Aedas were responsible for employing all consultants and for developing, co-ordinating and implementing the design. The structural engineering for the project was handled by Arup with Parsons Brinckerhoff the MEP engineers. The main contractor was Ssangyong Engineering and Construction.

The three towers are broader at the base and narrow as they rise. Each tower has two asymmetric legs, with a curved eastern leg leaning against the other, creating a significant technical challenge in its construction. Substantial temporary structures were necessary to support the legs of the tower while they were under construction, and required real-time monitoring for continual assessment and analyses in the course of their erection.

A distinctive feature of the hotel is the SkyPark, a three-acre park on top of the building with swimming pools, gardens, and jogging paths. The structure bridges all three towers with a segment cantilevered off the north tower. The hull of the SkyPark was pre-fabricated off-site in 14 separate steel sections and then assembled on top of the towers. There are four movement joints beneath the main pools, designed to help them withstand the natural motion of the towers, and each joint has a unique range of motion. In addition to wind, the hotel towers are also subject to settlement in the earth over time, so engineers built and installed custom jack legs to allow for future adjustment at more than 500 points beneath the pool system. This jacking system is important primarily to ensure the infinity edge of the pool continues to function properly.

Opening

Marina Bay Sands was originally planned to be completed in a single phase in 2009, but rising construction costs and the financial crisis forced the company to open it in phases. The first phase's preview opening was further delayed until 27 April 2010, and the official opening was pushed back to 23 June 2010. The rest of the complex remained under construction and was opened after a grand opening on 17 February 2011.

On 27 April 2010, Marina Bay Sands had the first of a planned 3 to 4 phase openings. The casino, parts of the conference hall, a segment of the Shoppes, 963 hotel rooms and the event plaza were opened at the auspicious time of 3:18 p.m as part of the "preview opening".

The Inter-Pacific Bar Association (IPBA) held the first conference at Marina Bay Sands Convention Centre on 2–5 May 2010, but the event was marred by uncompleted facilities and power failure during a speech. IPBA withheld payment of S$300,000 and was consequently sued by Marina Bay Sands. In June IPBA counter-sued, describing the venue as a "complete disaster" and that its earlier payments had been imposed by "duress, fear and force". An "amicable settlement" with undisclosed terms was announced in August.

On 23 June 2010, the resort had its official opening with a "2-day celebration"; this includes the Sands SkyPark, the Event Plaza along Marina Bay, more shops, additional dining options and nightlife offerings, and the rest of the hotel rooms. First day events included a "World Championship Climb" on the glass facade of the building to the SkyPark, with seven teams of 21 top rock climbers from around the world competing, and an evening concert for 4,000 invited guests and customers, featuring one international rapper such as Kelly Rowland and one national contemporary R&B such as Sylvia Ratonel. The SkyPark was opened on the second day at 2 p.m., with about 2,000 adult tickets costing S$20 each sold.

The Sands theatre was completed in time for the first performance by Riverdance on 30 November 2010. The ArtScience Museum opened its doors to the public at 10 am on 19 February 2011. The musical The Lion King made its debut on 3 March 2011. The floating pavilions were opened when the tenants Louis Vuitton and Pangaea Club finished their refurbishment and opened on 18 September 2011 and 22 September 2011, respectively. The Lion King ran its last show on 30 October 2011.

Facilities

Marina Bay Sands has three 55-storey hotel towers which were topped out in July 2009. The three towers are connected by a 1 hectare roof terrace, Sands SkyPark. The observation deck provides panoramic views across the bay.

In front of the three towers include a Theatre Block, a Convention and Exhibition Facilities Block, as well as the Casino Block, which have up to 1,000 gaming tables and 1,400 slot machines. To enter the casino, Singaporeans and Permanent Residents (PRs) have to pay a SGD$150 fee for a one time entry and a S$2000 fee for an annual pass. The fee was changed on 4 April 2019 to SGD$150 for a one-time visit and S$3000 for yearly visits.

The ArtScience Museum is constructed next to the three blocks and has the shape of a lotus. Its roof is retractable, providing a waterfall through the roof of collected rainwater when closed in the day and laser shows when opened at night. In front of the Event Plaza is Wonder Full, a light and water show that is the largest in Southeast Asia and was produced by Laservision. The ArtScience Museum and Wonder Full show opened on 17 February 2011.

The SkyPark also has rooftop nightclubs such as Lavo (New York, Vegas) and Cé La Vi, gardens, hundreds of trees and plants, and a public observatory deck on the cantilever with 360-degree views of the Singapore skyline. The SkyPark is accessible only to hotel guests for security reasons.

A canal runs through the length of the Shoppes, in the same style as The Venetian in Las Vegas. Sampan rides on the canal are available for guests and shoppers at the shopping mall, similar to the gondola rides available in the Venetian. Also housed within the Shoppes are six of the ten Celebrity Chef restaurants—Bread Street Kitchen (by Gordon Ramsay), Cut (by Wolfgang Puck), Waku Ghin (by Tetsuya Wakuda), Pizzeria and Osteria Mozza (by Mario Batali), Long Chim (by David Thompson) and DB Bistro & Oyster Bar (by Daniel Boulud).

The north side of the Shoppes contained an ice skating rink, which used artificial ice. In 2017, it was replaced with a digital art exhibit.
 	

There are two Crystal Pavilions. Despite a brief legal dispute in June 2011, it was decided that one of the Pavilions will house two nightclubs—Avalon and Pangaea. Both Pavilions opened in 2011 just before the 2011 Formula One season came to the Marina Bay Street Circuit. The Pavilion vacant by Avalon and Pangaea will be taken over by Singapore's third Apple Store—Apple Marina Bay Sands n 2020.

Apple's third store in Singapore feature the company's first store that sits on water and one that is of spherical design.

The Sands Theatre seats 2,155 people, and has hosted shows such as The Lion King, Cirque Éloize, A. R. Rahman's Jai Ho, and Wicked.

Moshe Safdie designed an Art Path within the resort, incorporating installations by five artists including Zheng Chongbin, Antony Gormley and Sol LeWitt. The pieces are meant to play on environmental influences including light, water and wind, integrating art with architecture.

Attraction 
Wonder Full is a nighttime multimedia show displayed by Marina Bay Sands. It is designed by the Australian based multimedia company Laservision and incorporated various Laservision technology such as the Stella Ray. The show starts off with a single drop of water, representing the birth of life. It later stages through important stages of the person`s life such as childhood, development through age and adulthood.

Transportation

Mass Rapid Transit (MRT)
 Bayfront (Circle and Downtown Lines)

Public buses
 Services 97/97e, 106, 133, 502/502A, 518/518A

Water taxi
 From Grand Copthorne Water Front, Raffles Landing Side, Boat Quay, River Side Point and Robertson Quay

Controversy 
Marina Bay Sands was reportedly under investigation by the US Department of Justice over whether there were breaches of anti-money laundering regulations.

In late 2011, Marina Bay Sands had a dispute with Madam Choo Hong Eng, on whether she could obtain a big sum of money, which a slot machine had shown that she had won on 18 October 2011. The jackpot in question was SGD$416,721.12. A casino manager claimed that it was a machine error. Upon negotiation, the casino offered to give her a car which was worth SGD$258,962 instead. Ms Choo appointed a lawyer to demand that Marina Bay Sands pay her the whole sum. Several days later, the casino agreed to pay her that amount. The Singaporean government department - Casino Regulatory Authority, condemned the casino for failing to keep its machine operating properly. The mass media reported that Ms Choo had donated the whole of her winning to charities instead of keeping it to herself.

In 2011, the Marina Bay Sands resort publicized lucky punters on its webpages. The Singapore government noticed that and said it would take action against the company, according to the rule that casino operators in that country are prohibited from publicizing the winnings of patrons. The online information in question was subsequently removed.

About one month before Marina Bay Sands opened, Reuters reported that Sands had links with Hong Kong criminal organizations operating in Macau, according to court documents of a case of attempted murder. Several male gangsters of the criminal group Wo Hop Tou, were put in jail for that case. Witnesses testified that the mastermind was Mr Cheung Chi-tai, who operates a VIP room related to the murder attempt in the casino of Sands Macau. Mr Cheung is also a leader of the same criminal group. This raised concern in political parties like the National Solidarity Party and the mass media, in Singapore.

In popular culture

The towers of the Marina Bay Sands have made multiple televised appearance on various franchises of The Amazing Race including the fourth season of the Asian edition of The Amazing Race, the first season of the Australian edition of The Amazing Race, the second season of the Israeli edition of The Amazing Race, and the twenty-fifth season of the original American edition of The Amazing Race, all of which featured a tightrope walking task between two of the resort's towers. The SkyPark served as the finishing line for the first season of the British show Race Across the World.

A partially destroyed version of the structure was featured in the 2015 video game Call of Duty: Black Ops 3, which takes place 10 years after a biochemical disaster rendered most of Singapore's eastern half inhospitable.

It was featured in the 2015 movie Hitman: Agent 47, as it appears along with Gardens by the Bay.

The trailer of the 2016 movie Independence Day: Resurgence has a scene depicting the destruction of the property after being caught in the gravitational pull of a hovering alien spacecraft. It was also featured in the 2018 film Crazy Rich Asians, both in scenic B-roll of Singapore, as well as a setting towards the end of the film. Both the completed and partially destroyed versions of the structure are featured in the 2019 animated film Detective Conan: The Fist of Blue Sapphire, in the opening, various parts of the film, and the end credits. 

It is featured in HBO series Westworld, as part of the third season.

It is featured in the video games Mario Kart Tour and Mario Kart 8 Deluxe as part of the "Singapore Speedway" racecourse.

It will be featured in HBO series Euphoria, as part of the third season.

Gallery

See also

 Future developments in Singapore
 List of tallest buildings in Singapore
 Architecture of Singapore

Similar towers
 The Gate (Shams Abu Dhabi), building in Abu Dhabi

References
Notes

Further reading
  Discusses the engineering behind the project.

External links

 
 Las Vegas Sands press release on winning integrated resort bid
 Safdie Designing Ambitious Resort in Singapore (Architectural Record)
 Moshe Safdie and Associates | Project Details of the Marina Bay Sands
 Opening Event | Laservision

2010 establishments in Singapore
Casinos completed in 2010
Hotel buildings completed in 2010
Casinos in Singapore
Tourism in Singapore
Marina Bay, Singapore
Tourist attractions in Singapore
Landmarks in Singapore
Hotels in Singapore
Resorts in Singapore
Convention centres in Singapore
Shopping malls in Singapore
Moshe Safdie buildings